Tyger was the ship used by the Dutch captain Adriaen Block during his 1613 voyage to explore the East Coast of North America and the present day Hudson River. Its remains were uncovered in 1916 during the construction of the New York City Subway on land that is now part of the World Trade Center complex.

History
In late summer of 1613, Tyger had moored in Lower Manhattan on the Hudson to trade with the Lenape Indians along with its partner Hendrick Christiaensen's Fortuyn. By November, Tyger had been filled with pelts of beaver, otter, and other skins obtained in barter.

In November, an accidental fire broke out and Tyger rapidly burned to the waterline. The charred hull was beached and all but the small section of prow and keel salvaged in 1916 remained in that location, buried beneath what later became the intersection of Greenwich and Dey Streets in Lower Manhattan. During the fire, the crew salvaged some sails, rope, tools and fittings.

Over the winter, Block and his menpresumably with help from the Indiansbuilt Onrust (Restless), which they used to explore the East River and Long Island Sound before returning to Europe in 1614.

Rediscovery
In 1916, workmen led by James A. Kelly uncovered the prow and keel of Tyger while excavating an extension for the New York City Subway BMT Broadway Line near the intersection of Greenwich and Dey Streets.

The timbers were placed in the seal tank of the New York Aquarium in Battery Park. In 1943, they were presented to the Museum of the City of New York for exhibition in the Marine Gallery.

Also, Tyger appears not to have been the only ship wrecked on the World Trade Center site.

See also
 New Netherland

References

Exploration ships of the Dutch Republic
New Netherland
17th-century maritime incidents